Vili Alaalatoa (born August 9, 1962) is a Samoan rugby union player. He plays as a prop. He played for West Harbour RFC, and then, for Manly RUFC

Career
Alaalatoa debuted for Western Samoa in the test match against Ireland at Lansdowne Road in 1988. He was a member of the Western Samoan team during the 1991 Rugby World Cup. His last international for Western Samoa was a test against Fiji in 1992, at Suva.

Personal life
A fan of cricket, Vili is father of Michael Ala'alatoa, who plays for Leinster and Allan Alaalatoa, who plays for the Brumbies and Australia, who was named after Australia cricket captain Allan Border.

Alaalatoa was Senior Prefect at Ashfield Boys High School (Australia) in 1982. His nickname was ‘shoebox’ because of the size of his feet.

References

External links
 Vili Alalatoa International Statistics

1962 births
Living people
Samoan rugby union players
Samoan expatriates in Australia
Rugby union props
Samoa international rugby union players